Saint Agilus (or Agilo, Ayeul, Aisle, Ail, Aile; c. 580–650) was a Frankish nobleman who became a Christian missionary in Bavaria and later was abbot of Rebais monastery near Paris, France.
He was considered a saint, and his feast day is 30 August.

Life

Saint Agilus or Ayeul was from a noble Frankish family, son of Chagnoald and descended from Pharamond and Frotmund.
He was educated by Saint Columbanus in Luxeuil Abbey, France. 
He served as a missionary in Bavaria, Germany.
According to tradition, Weltenburg Abbey in Bavaria was founded around 617 AD in the course of the Hiberno-Scottish mission by Agilus and Eustace of Luxeuil, two monks of Luxeuil Abbey.
At the council of Clichy on 1 May 636 Agilus was made the first abbot of the Rebais monastery.
He died in 650 AD.
He was buried in the Saint-Jean church, which became the parish church of the town of Rebais.
He was succeeded as abbot by his disciple Saint Filibert.

Butler's account

The hagiographer Alban Butler wrote,

Notes

Sources

6th-century Frankish saints
7th-century Frankish saints
580 births
650 deaths